Paraguay's transportation system ranges from adequate to poor, largely depending on the region of the country. The country has a network of roads, railroads, rivers, and airports, but significant infrastructure and regulation improvements are needed.

Roads in Paraguay

The discrepancies seem to be the result of differing standards regarding what constitutes a road. Thousands of kilometers of unpaved rural roads exist. The core network connects Asunción, Encarnación, and Ciudad del Este. The Trans-Chaco highway is only partially finished, the paved portion ending at Mariscal Estigarribia. Bolivias portion of the highway, in contrast, is entirely paved. For trade purposes, the paved highways from Ciudad del Este to the Brazilian port of Paranaguá are particularly important. Additionally, the roads connecting Paraguay to Buenos Aires are adequate.

* Estimated
Source:

Railways 

The government owns the country's sole railroad company, including a  line from Asunción to Encarnación. An effort to privatize the company in 2002 failed when no buyer could be secured because of the steep investment required to make the line profitable. Currently, only a small section of the line is open. It is used for tourist traffic. Paraguay's railroads operate on a standard 1.435-meter gauge.

Inland waterways 

Paraguay has  of inland waterways. The Paraguay and Paraná are the country's two main rivers. The Paraguay River, with headwaters at Mato Grosso, Brazil, flows southward, converging with the Paraná in southwestern Paraguay, and then flowing to the Río de la Plata estuary in Argentina, the entrance for the great majority of ships servicing Paraguay's ports.

Ports and harbors 

Villeta, located south of Asunción, serves as Paraguay's primary port. Asunción, long the country's only modern port, Encarnación, and San Antonio serve as the country's other major ports. Paraguay's ports are split between state and private ownership. The country's twenty private ports, however, are far more efficient, handling nearly 90% of soybean exports.

Paraguay River
 Asunción
 Villeta
 San Antonio

Paraná River
 Encarnación

Merchant marine 
Total: 110

Container ship: 3

General cargo: 25

Oil tanker: 5

Other: 77 (2021)

Airports

As of 2013, Paraguay has 799 airports but only 15 with paved runways. The airport serving Asunción, Silvio Pettirossi International Airport, is the country's major airport for international and domestic flights. Another airport is Guaraní International Airport, located near Ciudad del Este and the Brazilian border, but it has been unable to compete with the nearby international airport at Foz do Iguaçu in Brazil. Improvements in technology are needed to bring Paraguay's airports up to international standards. Paraguay privatized the state-owned Líneas Aéreas Paraguayas in 1994.

See also 
 Paraguay
 Rail transport by country

References

External links